Edward Joseph Cihocki (May 9, 1907 – November 9, 1987) was a professional baseball player. Nicknamed "Cy", he was a shortstop over parts of two seasons (1932–33) with the Philadelphia Athletics.  For his career, he compiled a .143 batting average in 98 at-bats, with nine runs batted in.

He was born in Wilmington, Delaware and died in Newark, Delaware at the age of 80.

External links

1907 births
1987 deaths
Philadelphia Athletics players
Major League Baseball shortstops
Baseball players from Wilmington, Delaware
Harrisburg Senators players
Syracuse Chiefs players
Albany Senators players
Birmingham Barons players
Los Angeles Angels (minor league) players